WBHJ (95.7 FM) is an urban-leaning rhythmic-formatted radio station that serves Birmingham, Alabama.  In 2005, it also began broadcasting in IBOC digital radio, using the HD Radio system from iBiquity.  It is owned by SummitMedia along with six other stations in the market, and all share studios in the Cahaba neighborhood in far southeast Birmingham where the Program Director is Nuyork. Its transmitter is located atop Red Mountain in Birmingham.

History 
95.7 originally came on the air in 1958 as WTBC-FM, a Tuscaloosa station that was a companion to WTBC (AM)/1230 with its transmitter on 15th Street. As WTBC-FM, the station was just a placeholder for the AM station, playing a stack of MOR format LPs on a turntable. A contributor who worked at WTBC (AM) notes that when the stack of records was finished, it just started playing over. Station IDs weren't done regularly because they were done by the often-forgetful AM jocks. The program director would go live for a few hours each night and was probably the only live person on the air daily. In 1969, It later became WUOA (University of Alabama), an adult contemporary-formatted college radio station.  Another change occurred in 1984 with the calls switching to WFFX, "95.7 the Fox", and the addition of modern rock.

It then moved into the Birmingham market in the 1990s, and was during that period the transmitter moved to a taller tower near Vance.  On July 15, 1996, the calls were changed to WBHJ and the format of the station to "95.7 Jamz", an Urban-formatted radio station. The first Jamz program director was Mickey Johnson. Since that time, the station has been one of Birmingham's top rated radio stations.

In November 2004, after years of being plagued by an inadequate signal into its primary listening area of Birmingham, the station applied for a construction permit to the Federal Communications Commission (FCC) to move its transmitter from Vance to Red Mountain. In June 2005 the station completed a move to boost its signal in the Birmingham market by getting relicensed to the Birmingham suburb of Midfield and moving its transmitter site from rural Bibb County (near Vance) to Red Mountain, where the other high-power Birmingham stations are located.  Although the move required a reduction in power from 100 kilowatts to just 12.2 kilowatts, the move has provided a strong signal to listeners in the immediate market area.

WBHJ is a rhythmic contemporary reporter on Mediabase and an urban reporter per Nielsen BDS.

On July 20, 2012, Cox Radio, Inc. announced the sale of WBHJ and 22 other stations to Summit Media LLC for $66.25 million. The sale was consummated on May 3, 2013.

Station management 
 General Manager: John Walker
 Program Director: NuYork 
 Music Director: Young Dil

References

External links
95.7 Jamz WBHJ official website

Mainstream urban radio stations in the United States
Rhythmic contemporary radio stations in the United States
BHJ
Radio stations established in 1958
1958 establishments in Alabama